Sayyid Faisal Bin Ali Bin Faisal Al-Said is the Minister of National Heritage and Culture of Oman.

References

Living people
Year of birth missing (living people)
Place of birth missing (living people)
Culture ministers of Oman